SFC (Students For Christ) is a students' campus ministry operating in Russia. It is a ministry of students from different denominations and backgrounds. The headquarters is located in Saint Petersburg. This is a students' ministry with a variety of students studying in Russia from different parts of the world: from Russia itself, Europe, Africa, Asia, America etc. SFC has recently grown to many cities in Russia and some surrounding countries.

SFC is pentecostal in nature though interdenominational as it is sponsored by the Assemblies of God. It is in many respects similar to Chi Alpha and Campus Crusade for Christ in the United States and its main goal is to introduce information about Jesus Christ to students.

Purpose 
The declared main purpose of SFC is to build a better relationship between members of different Christian fellowships throughout Russia and presenting Christ to the students who don't know about the subject. Therefore, the organization tends to create above all spiritual atmosphere of help and support, yet with maintaining academic, social, financial and physical aspects of help to the group members through the Christian information.

History 
The history of SFC was made with the help of its friends and volunteers. J & A, E & J have been volunteering since 1993 and have helped SFC while collaborating with the national churches. From 1993 till 1998, they volunteer in Kemerovo and were involved with student, churches, literature distribution and humanitarian aid. It was at Kemerovo State University, where the first SFC was pioneered, and later established in other different cities.

Structure and operation
SFC stands on what is known as the "Five Pillars" of SFC. These are:
Evangelism
Prayer
Discipleship
Worship
Fellowship

SFC incorporates most of these pillars in their day-to-day meetings.

Christianity in Russia